Empress of France or Empress of the French may refer to:

People
Joséphine de Beauharnais, first wife of Napoleon I
Marie Louise, Duchess of Parma, second wife of Napoleon I
Eugénie de Montijo, wife of Napoleon III

Ships
SS Empress of France
RMS Empress of France 1914-1928
RMS Empress of France 1928-1960

See also
 List of French monarchs
 List of French consorts
 List of Frankish queens
 Queen of France